Lee Chong Wei is a 2018 Malaysian epic biographical sports drama film directed by Teng Bee, about the inspirational story of national icon Lee Chong Wei (also features as a cameo appearances), who rose from sheer poverty to become the top badminton player in the world. The film is based on Lee's 2012 autobiography Dare to Be a Champion (which has been translated into English by Patty Tai Peck Sing). The film stars in the titular role 2 newcomers: 13-year-old Jake Eng and 22-year-old Tosh Chan, who were picked from more than 2,000 auditioned hopefuls.

Plot
The movie begins with a young boy asking Lee how to be as good of a shuttler as him after a badminton match. A flashback then brings Lee back to his tough upbringing and the story of how he overcame setbacks along the way. The film features a mix of real-life accounts and dramatic fiction, culminating in the 2006 Malaysia Open final where Lee miraculously saved 8 match points against great rival Lin Dan to win the title, one of the few and first occasions where Lee defeated Lin in their numerous encounters over the span of their decade-long rivalry.

Cast
Jake Eng as young Lee Chong Wei
Tosh Chan as adult Lee Chong Wei
Mark Lee as Lee Ah Chai, Lee Chong Wei's father
Yeo Yann Yann as Khor Kim Chooi, Lee Chong Wei's mother
Ashley Hua as Wong Mew Choo, Lee Chong Wei's teammate and love interest, later wife
Rosyam Nor as Misbun Sidek, Lee Chong Wei's national team coach
Freddie Wong as Teh Peng Huat, Lee Chong Wei's junior coach
Uriah See as Yang Kun Cheng, Lee Chong Wei's rival
 Sherie Merlis as Latifah Sidek, Misbun Sidek's wife
Bernard Hiew
Norman Pang
Wilson Tin
Jacky Kam
Agnes Lim as Lee Bee Kim, Lee Chong Wei's sister
Ling Tai Yong (aka Ling Big Yong) as Lee Chong Wei's brother and also a youtuber

Reception
The film received generally average reviews, but earned RM2 million in ticket sales in the first 4 days of release. It peaked at number 3 in the Malaysian cinema charts upon release, and fell to number 4 the following week.

Although the movie was supposed to be released throughout Asia, it failed to make a splash in neighbouring Singapore, garnering only S$10,000 in ticket sales upon release and a total of under S$75,000 after a 4-day run. Nevertheless, it peaked at number 6 in Singapore and maintained in the weekly top 10 charts for 4 consecutive weeks. 

However, the film performed strongly in other markets, having grossed ¥6.58 million in China where it was released on 7 September 2018. Following its release in Taiwan on 28 September 2018, it surpassed NT$1 million after just 3 days and eventually passed the $2 million mark.

References

External links
 
 
 

2018 films
Biographical films about sportspeople
2010s sports films
Hokkien-language films
2010s Mandarin-language films
Malay-language films
Badminton films
2010s English-language films
Cultural depictions of badminton players
Malaysian sports films
2018 multilingual films
Malaysian multilingual films